Igor Konstantinovich Kunitsyn  (born September 30, 1981) is a retired tennis player from Russia. He made it into the top 100 for the first time in 2006, and reached a career-high singles ranking of world No. 35 in July 2009.

Early life
Kunitsyn was raised by his grandparents in Vladivostok, on the eastern coast of Russia when he was young. He started playing tennis at age seven.

Tennis career
Kunitsyn is arguably best known for two matches against compatriot Marat Safin. The first of which was at the 2007 Tennis Channel Open's round-robin stage. Kunitsyn had won the first set, and had an early break in the second before Safin fought back and then got a 5–3 lead. While serving for the match, Kunitsyn broke Safin and then held to get it to 5–5. The set went to a tiebreaker which Safin won. Kunitsyn was still dangerous, as he won the first three games of the third set, before losing the next four. Kunitsyn performed the same as before, and broke Safin again to get the set on equal terms. At 5–5, Kunitsyn suffered a service break and Safin ultimately won the third set 7–5. The pair met again in the final of the Kremlin Cup, an ATP tournament played in Moscow. Kunitsyn defeated the former two-time Grand Slam winner and world No. 1.

In August 2008, he made the semifinals of the Legg Mason Tennis Classic, beating Mischa Zverev, Fabio Fognini, and Somdev Devvarman, before losing Viktor Troicki.

In June 2009, he lost to Israeli Dudi Sela, at 's-Hertogenbosch in the Netherlands in a grass-court tune-up for Wimbledon. In Wimbledon, he defeated Wimbledon debutant wildcard Grigor Dimitrov due to retirement after suffering a knee injury , before he lost to Andy Roddick in the second round in four sets, winning the third set. Following the tournament, he reached his career-high singles ranking of World No. 35 on 6 July 2009.

Heavily favored Russia was hosted by Israel in a Davis Cup quarterfinal tie in July 2009, on indoor hard courts at the Nokia Arena in Tel Aviv. With Israel having won the first two matches, in what proved to be the deciding third match Israelis Andy Ram and Jonathan Erlich beat Kunitsyn and Marat Safin, 6–3, 6–4, 6–7, 4–6, 6–4, in front of a boisterous crowd of over 10,000. Israel defeated Russia 4–1 for the win.

At the 2009 Indianapolis Tennis Championships in July, Kunistyn was beaten in the second round by 23-year-old American Wayne Odesnik.

In 2012 Wimbledon, he lost his first-round match to Go Soeda.

ATP career finals

Singles: 1 (1 title)

Doubles: 4 (1 title, 3 runner-ups)

ATP Challenger and ITF Futures finals

Singles: 26 (14–12)

Doubles: 11 (5–6)

Performance timelines

Singles

Doubles

References

External links

 
 
 
 
 Kunitsyn World Ranking History

1981 births
Living people
Sportspeople from Vladivostok
Russian male tennis players